Astroscopus sexspinosus, the Brazilian stargazer, is a species of electric stargazer (Astroscopus) found off the coast of southern Brazil and northern Argentina. The Brazilian Stargazer can be found to depths of 49 feet (15m).

References

Uranoscopidae
Fish of Brazil
Fish of Argentina

Fish described in 1876